THAP domain-containing protein 7 is a protein that in humans is encoded by the THAP7 gene.

References

Further reading